Tullett is a surname. Notable people with the surname include:

 Ed Tullett, English producer and songwriter
 Hayley Tullett (born 1973), Welsh middle-distance runner
 Tom Tullett (1915–1991), also known as E. V. Tullett, British journalist

See also
 Tullett Prebon, money brokerage founded by Derek Tullett in 1971